Edward V (2 November 1470 – ) was de jure King of England from 9 April to 25 June 1483. He succeeded his father, Edward IV, upon the latter's death. Edward V was never crowned, and his brief reign was dominated by the influence of his uncle and Lord Protector, the Duke of Gloucester, who deposed him to reign as King Richard III; this was confirmed by the Act entitled Titulus Regius, which denounced any further claims through his father's heirs.

Edward V and his younger brother Richard of Shrewsbury, Duke of York, were the Princes in the Tower who disappeared after being sent to heavily guarded royal lodgings in the Tower of London. Responsibility for their deaths is widely attributed to Richard III, but the lack of solid evidence and conflicting contemporary accounts allow for other possibilities.

Early life
Edward was born on 2 November 1470 at Cheyneygates, the medieval house of the Abbot of Westminster, adjoining Westminster Abbey. His mother, Elizabeth Woodville, had sought sanctuary there from Lancastrian supporters who had deposed his father, the Yorkist king Edward IV, during the course of the Wars of the Roses. Edward was created Prince of Wales in June 1471, following his father's restoration to the throne, and in 1473 was established at Ludlow Castle on the Welsh Marches as nominal president of a newly created Council of Wales and the Marches. In 1479, his father conferred the earldom of Pembroke on him; it became merged into the crown on his succession.

Prince Edward was placed under the supervision of the queen's brother Anthony Woodville, 2nd Earl Rivers, a noted scholar. In a letter to Rivers, Edward IV set down precise conditions for the upbringing of his son and the management of the prince's household. He was to "arise every morning at a convenient hour, according to his age". His day would begin with matins and then Mass, which he was to receive uninterrupted. After breakfast, the business of educating the prince began with "virtuous learning". Dinner was served from ten in the morning, and then he was to be read "noble stories ... of virtue, honour, cunning, wisdom, and of deeds of worship" but "of nothing that should move or stir him to vice". Perhaps aware of his own vices, the king was keen to safeguard his son's morals, and instructed Rivers to ensure that no one in the prince's household was a habitual "swearer, brawler, backbiter, common hazarder, adulterer, [or user of] words of ribaldry". After further study, in the afternoon the prince was to engage in sporting activities suitable for his class, before evensong. Supper was served from four, and curtains were to be drawn at eight. Following this, the prince's attendants were to "enforce themselves to make him merry and joyous towards his bed". They would then watch over him as he slept.

Dominic Mancini reported of the young Edward V:

As with several of his other children, Edward IV planned a prestigious European marriage for his eldest son, and in 1480 concluded an alliance with Francis II, Duke of Brittany, whereby Prince Edward was betrothed to the duke's four-year-old heir, Anne. The two were to be married upon their majority, with their eldest son inheriting England and their second son Brittany. Anne later married Maximilian I, Holy Roman Emperor.

Reign

It was at Ludlow that the 12-year-old Edward received news, on Monday 14 April 1483, of his father's sudden death five days before. Edward IV's will, which has not survived, nominated his trusted brother Richard, Duke of Gloucester, as Protector during the minority of his son. The new king left Ludlow on 24 April, with Richard leaving York a day earlier, planning to meet at Northampton and travel to London together. However, when Richard reached Northampton, Edward and his party had already travelled onward to Stony Stratford, Buckinghamshire. The Earl Rivers travelled back to Northampton to meet Richard and Buckingham who had now arrived. On the night of 29 April Richard dined with Rivers and Edward's half-brother, Richard Grey, but the following morning Rivers, Grey and the king's chamberlain, Thomas Vaughan, were arrested and sent north. Despite Richard's assurances all three were subsequently executed. Dominic Mancini, an Italian who visited England in the 1480s, reports that Edward protested, but the remainder of his entourage was dismissed and Richard escorted him to London. On 19 May 1483, the new king took up residence in the Tower of London, where, on 16 June, he was joined by his younger brother Richard of Shrewsbury, Duke of York.

The council had originally hoped for an immediate coronation to avoid the need for a protectorate. This had previously happened with Richard II, who had become king at the age of ten. Another precedent was Henry VI whose protectorate (which started when he inherited the crown aged 9 months) had ended with his coronation aged seven. Richard, however, repeatedly postponed the coronation.

On 22 June, Ralph Shaa preached a sermon declaring that Edward IV had already been contracted to marry Lady Eleanor Butler when he married Elizabeth Woodville, thereby rendering his marriage to Elizabeth invalid and their children together illegitimate. The children of Richard's older brother George, Duke of Clarence, were barred from the throne by their father's attainder, and therefore, on 25 June, an assembly of Lords and Commons declared Richard to be the legitimate king (this was later confirmed by the act of parliament Titulus Regius). The following day he acceded to the throne as King Richard III.

Disappearance

Dominic Mancini recorded that after Richard III seized the throne, Edward and his brother Richard were taken into the "inner apartments of the Tower" and then were seen less and less until the end of the summer to the autumn of 1483, when they disappeared from public view altogether. During this period Mancini records that Edward was regularly visited by a doctor, who reported that Edward, "like a victim prepared for sacrifice, sought remission of his sins by daily confession and penance, because he believed that death was facing him." The Latin reference to  had previously been translated as "a doctor from Strasbourg", because the Latin name for the city of Strasbourg, was still current at the time; however, D. E. Rhodes suggests it may actually refer to "Doctor Argentine", whom Rhodes identifies as John Argentine, an English physician who would later serve as provost of King's College, Cambridge, and as doctor to Arthur, Prince of Wales, eldest son of King Henry VII of England (Henry Tudor).

The princes' fate after their disappearance remains unknown, but the most widely accepted theory is that they were murdered on the orders of their uncle, King Richard. Thomas More wrote that they were smothered to death with their pillows, and his account forms the basis of William Shakespeare's play Richard III, in which Tyrrell murders the princes on Richard's orders. In the absence of hard evidence a number of other theories have been put forward, of which the most widely discussed are that they were murdered on the orders of Henry Stafford, 2nd Duke of Buckingham, or by Henry Tudor. However, A. J. Pollard points out that these theories are less plausible than the straightforward one that they were murdered by their uncle who in any case controlled access to them and was therefore regarded as responsible for their welfare. In the period before the boys' disappearance, Edward was regularly being visited by a doctor; historian David Baldwin extrapolates that contemporaries may have believed Edward had died of an illness (or as the result of attempts to cure him). An alternative theory is that Perkin Warbeck, a pretender to the throne, was indeed Richard, Duke of York, as he claimed, having escaped to Flanders after his uncle's defeat at Bosworth to be raised by his aunt, Margaret, Duchess of Burgundy.

Bones belonging to two children were discovered in 1674 by workmen rebuilding a stairway in the Tower. On the orders of King Charles II, these were subsequently placed in Westminster Abbey, in an urn bearing the names of Edward and Richard. The bones were re-examined in 1933, at which time it was discovered the skeletons were incomplete and had been interred with animal bones. It has never been proven that the bones belonged to the princes, and it is possible that they were buried before the reconstruction of that part of the Tower of London. Permission for a subsequent examination has been refused.

In 1789, workmen carrying out repairs in St George's Chapel, Windsor Castle, rediscovered and accidentally broke into the vault of Edward IV and Elizabeth Woodville. Adjoining this was another vault, which was found to contain the coffins of two children. This tomb was inscribed with the names of two of Edward IV's children who had predeceased him: George, Duke of Bedford, and Mary. However, the remains of these two children were later found elsewhere in the chapel, leaving the occupants of the children's coffins within the tomb unknown.

In 1486 Edward IV's daughter Elizabeth, sister of Edward V, married Henry VII, thereby uniting the Houses of York and Lancaster.

Epitaph

As outlined above, on the orders of Charles II, the presumed bones of Edward V and his brother Richard were interred in Westminster Abbey; Edward was thus buried in the place of his birth. The white marble sarcophagus was designed by Sir Christopher Wren and made by Joshua Marshall. The sarcophagus can be found in the north aisle of the Henry VII Chapel, near Elizabeth I's tomb.

The Latin inscription on the urn can be translated as follows:

The original Latin text is as follows (original all in capitals):

Genealogy

Portrayals in fiction
Edward appears as a character in the play Richard III by William Shakespeare. Edward appears alive in only one scene of the play (Act 3 Scene 1), during which he and his brother are portrayed as bright, precocious children who see through their uncle's ambitions. Edward in particular is portrayed as wiser than his years (something his uncle notes) and ambitious about his kingship. Edward and his brother's deaths are described in the play, but occur offstage. Their ghosts return in one more scene (Act 5 Scene 3) to haunt their uncle's dreams and promise success to his rival, Richmond (i.e. King Henry VII). In film and television adaptations of this play, Edward V has been portrayed by the following actors:

 Kathleen Yorke in the 1911 silent short dramatising a part of the play.
 Howard Stuart in the 1912 silent adaptation.
 Paul Huson in the 1955 film version, alongside Laurence Olivier as Richard.
 Hugh Janes in the 1960 BBC series An Age of Kings, which contained all the history plays from Richard II to Richard III.
 Nicolaus Haenel in the 1964 West German TV version 
 Dorian Ford in the 1983 BBC Shakespeare version.
 Spike Hood provided his voice in the 1994 BBC series Shakespeare: The Animated Tales.
 Marco Williamson in the 1995 film version, alongside Ian McKellen as Richard.
 Jon Plummer in the 2005 modernised TV version set on a Brighton housing estate.
 Germaine De Leon in the 2007 modern-day adaptation.
 Edward Bracey in the 2014 drama documentary Richard III: The Princes in the Tower.
 Caspar Morley played Edward in the BBC's 2016 adaptation of Shakespeare's Richard III alongside Benedict Cumberbatch as Richard. It is the final episode in the second season of The Hollow Crown.

Edward V is also featured as a mute role in another of Shakespeare's plays, Henry VI, Part 3, where he appears as a newborn baby in the final scene. His father Edward IV addresses his own brothers thus: "Clarence, and Gloster, love my lovely queen, And kiss your princely nephew, brothers both." Gloster, the future Richard III, is at the close of this play already encompassing his nephew's demise, as he mutters in an aside, "To say the truth, so Judas kiss'd his master, And cried – All hail! when as he meant – all harm."

Edward appears in The White Queen, a 2009 historical novel by Philippa Gregory and in the subsequent 2013 TV miniseries The White Queen; in the latter, he is played by Sonny Ashbourne Serkis.

Heraldry
As heir apparent, Edward bore the royal arms (quarterly France and England) differenced by a label of three points argent. During his brief reign, he used the royal arms undifferenced, supported by a lion and a hart as had his father. His livery badges were the traditional Yorkist symbols of the fetterlocked falcon and the rose argent.

Notes

References

External links

 Edward V at the official website of the British monarchy
 Edward V at BBC History
 

 
1470 births
1480s deaths
1480s missing person cases
15th-century English monarchs
15th-century English nobility
Disappeared princes
Dukes of Cornwall
Earls of March (England)
Earls of Pembroke
English people of French descent
English pretenders to the French throne
House of York
Knights of the Garter
Medieval child monarchs
Missing person cases in England
People from Westminster
People of the Wars of the Roses
Princes of Wales
Prisoners in the Tower of London
Monarchs deposed as children
Monarchs who died as children
Children of Edward IV of England